Caspase-3 is a caspase protein that interacts with caspase-8 and caspase-9. It is encoded by the CASP3 gene. CASP3 orthologs have been identified in numerous mammals for which complete genome data are available. Unique orthologs are also present in birds, lizards, lissamphibians, and teleosts.

The CASP3 protein is a member of the cysteine-aspartic acid protease (caspase) family. Sequential activation of caspases plays a central role in the execution-phase of cell apoptosis. Caspases exist as inactive proenzymes that undergo proteolytic processing at conserved aspartic residues to produce two subunits, large and small, that dimerize to form the active enzyme. This protein cleaves and activates caspases 6 and 7; and the protein itself is processed and activated by caspases 8, 9, and 10. It is the predominant caspase involved in the cleavage of amyloid-beta 4A precursor protein, which is associated with neuronal death in Alzheimer's disease. Alternative splicing of this gene results in two transcript variants that encode the same protein.

Caspase-3 shares many of the typical characteristics common to all currently-known caspases.  For example, its active site contains a cysteine residue (Cys-163) and histidine residue (His-121) that stabilize the peptide bond cleavage of a protein sequence to the carboxy-terminal side of an aspartic acid when it is part of a particular 4-amino acid sequence.  This specificity allows caspases to be incredibly selective, with a 20,000-fold preference for aspartic acid over glutamic acid.  A key feature of caspases in the cell is that they are present as zymogens, termed procaspases, which are inactive until a biochemical change causes their activation.  Each procaspase has an N-terminal large subunit of about 20 kDa followed by a smaller subunit of about 10 kDa, called p20 and p10, respectively.

Substrate specificity 
Under normal circumstances, caspases recognize tetra-peptide sequences on their substrates and hydrolyze peptide bonds after aspartic acid residues. Caspase 3 and caspase 7 share similar substrate specificity by recognizing tetra-peptide motif Asp-x-x-Asp. The C-terminal Asp is absolutely required while variations at other three positions can be tolerated.  Caspase substrate specificity has been widely used in caspase based inhibitor and drug design.

Structure
Caspase-3, in particular, (also known as CPP32/Yama/apopain) is formed from a 32 kDa zymogen that is cleaved into 17 kDa and 12 kDa subunits.  When the procaspase is cleaved at a particular residue, the active heterotetramer can then be formed by hydrophobic interactions, causing four anti-parallel beta-sheets from p17 and two from p12 to come together to make a heterodimer, which in turn interacts with another heterodimer to form the full 12-stranded beta-sheet structure surrounded by alpha-helices that is unique to caspases.  When the heterodimers align head-to-tail with each other, an active site is positioned at each end of the molecule formed by residues from both participating subunits, though the necessary Cys-163 and His-121 residues are found on the p17 (larger) subunit.

Mechanism
The catalytic site of caspase-3 involves the thiol group of Cys-163 and the imidazole ring of His-121.  His-121 stabilizes the carbonyl group of the key aspartate residue, while Cys-163 attacks to ultimately cleave the peptide bond.  Cys-163 and Gly-238 also function to stabilize the tetrahedral transition state of the substrate-enzyme complex through hydrogen bonding.  In vitro, caspase-3 has been found to prefer the peptide sequence DEVDG (Asp-Glu-Val-Asp-Gly) with cleavage occurring on the carboxy side of the second aspartic acid residue (between D and G).  Caspase-3 is active over a broad pH range that is slightly higher (more basic) than many of the other executioner caspases.  This broad range indicates that caspase-3 will be fully active under normal and apoptotic cell conditions.

Activation
Caspase-3 is activated in the apoptotic cell both by extrinsic (death ligand) and intrinsic (mitochondrial) pathways.  The zymogen feature of caspase-3 is necessary because if unregulated, caspase activity would kill cells indiscriminately.  As an executioner caspase, the caspase-3 zymogen has virtually no activity until it is cleaved by an initiator caspase after apoptotic signaling events have occurred.  One such signaling event is the introduction of granzyme B, which can activate initiator caspases, into cells targeted for apoptosis by killer T cells.  This extrinsic activation then triggers the hallmark caspase cascade characteristic of the apoptotic pathway, in which caspase-3 plays a dominant role.  In intrinsic activation, cytochrome c from the mitochondria works in combination with caspase-9, apoptosis-activating factor 1 (Apaf-1), and ATP to process procaspase-3.  These molecules are sufficient to activate caspase-3 in vitro, but other regulatory proteins are necessary in vivo.
Mangosteen (Garcinia mangostana) extract has been shown to inhibit the activation of caspase 3 in B-amyloid treated human neuronal cells.

Inhibition
One means of caspase inhibition is through the IAP (inhibitor of apoptosis) protein family, which includes c-IAP1, c-IAP2, XIAP, and ML-IAP.  XIAP binds and inhibits initiator caspase-9, which is directly involved in the activation of executioner caspase-3.  During the caspase cascade, however, caspase-3 functions to inhibit XIAP activity by cleaving caspase-9 at a specific site, preventing XIAP from being able to bind to inhibit caspase-9 activity.

Interactions 
Caspase 3 has been shown to interact with:

 CASP8
 NMT2
 CFLAR
 DCC
 GroEL
 HCLS1
 Survivin
 TRAF3
 XIAP
 NFE2L2

Biological function
Caspase-3 has been found to be necessary for normal brain development as well as its typical role in apoptosis, where it is responsible for chromatin condensation and DNA fragmentation.  Elevated levels of a fragment of Caspase-3, p17, in the bloodstream is a sign of a recent myocardial infarction. It is now being shown that caspase-3 may play a role in embryonic and hematopoietic stem cell differentiation.

See also 
 The Proteolysis Map
 Caspase
 PAC-1

References

Further reading

External links 

 The MEROPS online database for peptidases and their inhibitors: C14.003 
 Apoptosis & Caspase 3 – The Proteolysis Map-animation

EC 3.4.22